Kiwi Pass is a high pass in the Churchill Mountains of Antarctica, immediately northeast of Mount Egerton. It was named by the Northern Party of the New Zealand Geological Survey Antarctic Expedition (1960–61) who used the pass in crossing these mountains. Kiwi is a familiar nickname for New Zealanders.

References

Mountain passes of Antarctica
Landforms of Oates Land